Gabriele de' Gabrielli (1445–1511) (called the Cardinal of Urbino) was an Italian Roman Catholic bishop and cardinal.

Biography

Gabriele de' Gabrielli was a member of the Gabrielli family. He was born in Fano in 1445.

During the pontificate of Pope Alexander VI, he became a protonotary apostolic in Rome.  He then entered the service of Cardinal Giuliano della Rovere, the future Pope Julius II, travelling with Cardinal della Rovere to the Kingdom of France when the cardinal went into voluntary exile during the dispute between Pope Alexander VI and the della Rovere family.

On March 27, 1504, he was elected Bishop of Urbino.  He was consecrated as a bishop in the Vatican by Pope Julius II on April 9, 1504 with Antonio Pallavicini Gentili, Cardinal-Bishop of Palestrina, and Giovanni Antonio Sangiorgio, Cardinal-Bishop of Frascati, serving as co-consecrators.  He was enthroned in 1505 and occupied that see until his death.

Pope Julius II made him a cardinal deacon in the consistory of December 1, 1505.  He received the red hat and the deaconry of Sant'Agata dei Goti on December 17, 1505.  On September 11, 1507, he opted for the order of cardinal priests and received the titular church of Santa Prassede.

The pope named him papal legate in Perugia, but he soon had to resign because of poor health.  He served as papal legate at the meeting in Savona between Louis XII of France and Ferdinand II of Aragon.

He died in the Apostolic Palace in Rome on November 5, 1511.  He is buried in Santa Prassede.

References

1445 births
1511 deaths
16th-century Italian cardinals
People from Savona